Middletown is a census-designated place (CDP) in Lake County, California, United States. Its population was 1,323 at the 2010 census, up from 1,020 at the 2000 census. The town was severely damaged by the 2015 Valley Fire.

History
At one time, the community was known as Middle Station, and was a halfway point on the stagecoach route over Mt. St. Helena from Calistoga to Lower Lake. The first house was built at the site by J.H. Berry in 1870. The town began in 1871. The Middleton post office opened in 1871 and changed its name to Middletown in 1875. Middletown enjoyed a robust quicksilver (mercury) mining industry through the end of the 19th century. By the early 1900s, cattle and sheep ranching were prominent, along with some limited pear and walnut production. A resort economy sprung up around the various natural springs, and the area around Middletown attracted vacationers from the Bay Area through the 1950s. Many of the resorts closed in the 1960s. In the 1970s and early 1980s, exploitation of nearby geothermal energy resources brought an influx of workers into the local economy. Electrical power plants powered by "steam wells" were built in the mountains above Middletown. As housing prices in the Bay Area increased in the late 20th century, Middletown and nearby Hidden Valley Lake enjoyed a population boom as commuters moved to the Middletown area looking for affordable housing. Nearby tourism includes Harbin Hot Springs and the Twin Pine Casino located on the local Rancheria south of the town.

2015 Valley Fire

On September 12, 2015, about half the town, including city blocks, commercial buildings and an apartment complex, was destroyed by the fast-moving Valley Fire. The town was directly in the path of the advancing fire, and suffered a "devastating blow".

2019 Kincade Fire

The 2019 Kincade Fire started in Sonoma County and at some point prompted mandatory evacuations in Lake County.

Geography
Middletown has an elevation of 1,099 feet (335 m).

Climate
This region experiences hot and dry summers, with average summer monthly temperatures above . According to the Köppen Climate Classification system, Middletown has a warm-summer Mediterranean climate, abbreviated "Csb" on climate maps.

Demographics

2010
At the 2010 census Middletown had a population of 1,323. The racial makeup of Middletown was 985 (74.5%) White, 5 (0.4%) African American, 28 (2.1%) Native American, 18 (1.4%) Asian, 0 (0.0%) Pacific Islander, 225 (17.0%) from other races, and 62 (4.7%) from two or more races. Hispanic or Latino of any race were 413 people (31.2%).

The census reported that 1,317 people (99.5% of the population) lived in households, 6 (0.5%) lived in non-institutionalized group quarters, and no one was institutionalized.

There were 508 households; 189 (37.2%) had children under the age of 18 living in them, 223 (43.9%) were opposite-sex married couples living together, 72 (14.2%) had a female householder with no husband present, 41 (8.1%) had a male householder with no wife present.  There were 36 (7.1%) unmarried opposite-sex partnerships, and 4 (0.8%) same-sex married couples or partnerships. 140 households (27.6%) consisted of a single person and 52 (10.2%) had someone living alone who was 65 or older. The average household size was 2.59.  There were 336 families (66.1% of households); the average family size was 3.15.

The age distribution was 376 people (28.4%) under the age of 18, 114 people (8.6%) aged 18 to 24, 309 people (23.4%) aged 25 to 44, 374 people (28.3%) aged 45 to 64, and 150 people (11.3%) who were 65 or older.  The median age was 37.4 years. For every 100 females, there were 102.9 males.  For every 100 females age 18 and over, there were 103.2 males.

There were 557 housing units at an average density of 302.0 per square mile; of the occupied units, 251 (49.4%) were owner-occupied and 257 (50.6%) were rented. The homeowner vacancy rate was 3.8% and the rental vacancy rate was 4.1%.  659 people (49.8% of the population) lived in owner-occupied housing units and 658 people (49.7%) lived in rental housing units.

2000
At the 2000 census there were 1,020 people, 392 households, and 263 families in the CDP. The racial makeup of the CDP was 83.73% White, 0.39% African American, 1.86% Native American, 1.67% Asian, 0.69% Pacific Islander, 8.24% from other races, and 3.43% from two or more races. Hispanic or Latino of any race were 22.84%.

Of the 392 households 32.9% had children under the age of 18 living with them, 47.4% were married couples living together, 12.0% had a female householder with no husband present, and 32.7% were non-families. 24.0% of households were one person and 10.2% were one person aged 65 or older.  The average household size was 2.56 and the average family size was 3.05.

The age distribution was 26.6% under the age of 18, 7.5% from 18 to 24, 26.9% from 25 to 44, 23.9% from 45 to 64, and 15.2% 65 or older.  The median age was 38 years. For every 100 females, there were 110.3 males.  For every 100 females age 18 and over, there were 105.2 males.

The median household income was $35,278 and the median family income  was $38,571. Males had a median income of $33,214 versus $26,515 for females. The per capita income for the CDP was $14,135.  About 21.2% of families and 20.9% of the population were below the poverty line, including 22.1% of those under age 18 and 28.3% of those age 65 or over.

Education
Middletown Unified School District serves as the Middletown and Hidden Valley Lake area's school district. Middletown High School and Middletown Middle School share a campus together. Middletown Adventist School is a Christian elementary school also in the area.

Tourist attractions
Harbin Hot Springs, a New Age retreat center with spring pools, conference facilities, daily activities and classes, is located northwest of town. The Hot Springs were decimated by the 2015 California wildfires.

The Middletown Rancheria, an Indian reservation of Pomo, Lake Miwok, Wappo, and Wintu, is located just south of town. And is home to A tribal casino.

Government

Lake County is divided into five supervisorial districts, and Middletown is in District 1. As of January 2017, Jose "Moke" Simon is the supervisor for District 1.

References

Further reading
 Our small town: a brief history of Middletown, Lake County, California community treasures (1999). 
Campbell, W. L. (Rohnert Park, Calif., 2000). The development of first, second, and third grade mathematics benchmark tests for the Middletown Unified School District: alignment with the state standards 
Moratto, M. J. (1974). An evaluation of the archaeological resources near Middletown, California  San Francisco: Archaeological Research Laboratory, Dept. of Anthropology, San Francisco State University
Lusk, W. C., Reed, A. D., & Houston, C. E. (1963). Potential economic value of agricultural water in the Middletown Area of Lake County  Kelseyville, University of California, Agricultural Extension Service.
United States. (1965). Project report on the recreation potentialities of the proposed Middletown Project, Lake County, California  San Francisco: The Service
Tritchler, C. (1992). Middletown Cemetery, Butts Canyon Road and Highway 29, Lake County, Middletown, California: an inventory of gravesites, Middletown Cemetery District 

Census-designated places in Lake County, California
Populated places established in 1871
1871 establishments in California
Census-designated places in California